The Austria men's national volleyball team represents Austria in international men's volleyball competitions and friendly matches.

World Championship

World League

European Championship

European League

Current squad
The following is the Austrian roster in the 2017 World League.

Head coach:  Michael Warm

References

External links
Official website
FIVB profile

National men's volleyball teams
Volleyball men
Volleyball in Austria
Men's sport in Austria